Blackmans Bay is a coastal suburb of Kingborough Council, Tasmania, Australia. It forms part of the Kingston-Blackmans Bay urban area and is a satellite town of Greater Hobart. It borders Kingston Beach to the North, Maranoa Heights and the Peter Murrell Conservation Area to the West and Howden and Tinderbox to the South.

Etymology
Blackmans Bay is claimed to be named after a James Blackman who occupied land there in the 1820s, however there are few sources to support this. It is likely that this bay, like another "Blackman Bay", near Dunalley (also in Tasmania) was so named in 1642 because of the presence of Indigenous Tasmanians.

Geography
Blackmans Bay is located on the hills surrounding a popular sandy beach.

There is a blowhole near the northern end of the beach, which has eroded and forms a large rock arch where waves can be seen coming in and crashing on the rocks.

At the southern end of the beach are rocks leading to Flowerpot Point, a popular spot for fishing, although snags are an issue because of the prevalence of seaweed and rock ledges beneath the water. Beyond Flowerpot Point lies a quiet pebble beach that is accessible at low tide. The Suncoast Headlands walking track leads south via clifftops to Soldiers Rocks, dog exercise area and bushland loop walking track.

At the southern boundary of the suburb lies Fossil Cove , accessible via a steep walking track from Fossil Cove Drive.

Infrastructure
Blackmans Bay has three primary schools from kindergarten to grade six: Blackmans Bay, Illawarra, established in the late 1980s, and the Catholic St. Aloysius. 

The shopping centre Bayview Market, located centrally within the suburb includes a supermarket, newsagency, doctor's surgery, pharmacy and a variety of other stores.

Climate

References

Bays of Tasmania
Localities of Kingborough Council